The 1923 Buffalo All-Americans season was their fourth in the league and final season as the All-Americans. The team matched their previous output of 5–4–1, going 5–4–3. They finished eighth in the league.

Schedule

Standings

References

Buffalo All-Americans seasons
Buffalo All-Americans
Buffalo All-Americans